The 2015 Honkbal Hoofdklasse season started on Thursday, April 16 and will end with the Holland Series, taking place in September.

Eight teams will participate in the 2015 season. DSS was promoted from the Honkbal Overgangsklasse after defeating Mampaey The Hawks in the relegation series at the end of the 2014 season. Despite losing the relegation series, Mampaey The Hawks were reinstated into the league in February 2015 after AdoLakers withdrew and dissolved. DSS, UVV and Mampaey The Hawks are the only three current clubs to never have won a Holland Series.

Regular season standings

Updated on: May 27, 2015

Record vs. opponents

Updated on: May 27, 2015

Regular season schedule and results

April

May

References

Honkbal Hoofdklasse
Honk